The Lepidoptera of the Pitcairn Islands consist of both the butterflies and moths recorded from the Pitcairn Islands, consisting of Pitcairn, Henderson, Ducie and Oeno.

Butterflies

Nymphalidae
Hypolimnas bolina otaheitae (C Felder, 1862)

Moths

Arctiidae
Utetheisa pulchelloides Hampson, 1907

Cosmopterigidae
Unidentified species

Gelechiidae
Stoeberhinus testaceus Butler, 1881

Geometridae
Anisodes niveopuncta (Warren, 1897)
Gymnoscelis concinna Swinhoe, 1902
Thalassodes pilaria Guenée, 1857

Noctuidae
Achaea janata (Linnaeus, 1758)
Anomis flava (Fabricius, 1775)
Anomis sabulifera (Guenée, 1852)
Anticarsia irrorata (Fabricius, 1781)
Chrysodeixis eriosoma (Doubleday, 1843)
Condica conducta (Walker, [1857])
Condica illecta (Walker, 1865)
Spodoptera litura (Fabricius, 1775)
Targalla delatrix (Guenée, 1852)
Tiracola plagiata (Walker, 1857)

Pyralidae
Endotricha mesenterialis (Walker, 1859)

Sphingidae
Agrius convolvuli (Linnaeus, 1758)
Gnathothlibus erotus (Cramer, 1777)
Hippotion hateleyi Holloway, 1990

Tineidae
Erechthias species
Opogona species

References
"A checklist of the butterflies of Melanesia, Micronesia, Polynesia and some adjacent areas", by W. John Tennent, Zootaxa 1178: pp. 1–209, (21 April 2006)
The Lepidoptera of Easter, Pitcairn and Henderson Islands; by J.D. Holloway

Pitcairn
Lepidoptera
Pitcairn Islands
Pitcairn
Pitcairn Islands
Pitcairn Islands
Pitcairn
Pitcairn Islands
Pitcairn Islands